Arkansas Highway 155 (AR 155 and Hwy. 155) is a designation for four state highways in Arkansas. The northernmost segment of  runs from Mount Nebo State Park to AR 22 in Dardanelle. A second segment in Yell County of  connects Highway 7 and Highway 154. A third segment runs  from AR 10 near Casa to Petit Jean State Park. The fourth segment is a  spur from Highway 60 south to an area near Deberrie.

Route description

Mount Nebo State Park to Dardanelle

The route begins at Sunset Point on the north rim of Mount Nebo, in its respective state park, Mount Nebo State Park. It is surrounded by a dense forest while on the mountain and passes near the historic Mt. Nebo State Park Pavilion, the visitor center, and other points of interest in the park. Highway 155 winds down the mountain on eleven hairpin curves with very steep grades, as much as 18% in places. There are no alternative routes, as Route 155 is the only road up or down the mountain. As a result, the route is a popular destination for motorcycle riders, and trailers or RVs over 24 feet are prohibited in the state park. It eventually points due east toward Dardanelle. The route intersects with Highway 22 in the city and terminates.

Old Neely
The route begins at Arkansas Highway 7 and runs east and south through Old Neely to Arkansas Highway 154 in a right-angle manner. The route does not cross or concur with any other state highways. The route essentially serves as giving Old Neely access to the state highway system.

Casa to Petit Jean State Park

The route begins at Arkansas Highway 10 just east of Casa and runs north to serve as a terminus for Highway 247 and Highway 324. AR 155 continues to wind through forests before terminating at Highway 154 in Petit Jean State Park near the historic Seven Hollows Site.

Highway 60 to Perry CR 14
Arkansas Highway 155 is a brief spur route that begins at Arkansas Highway 60. The route runs due south to terminate near Deberrie, which is an unincorporated community.

Major intersections

See also

 List of state highways in Arkansas

Notes

References

External links

155
Transportation in Conway County, Arkansas
Transportation in Perry County, Arkansas
Transportation in Yell County, Arkansas